Timo Antero Susi (born January 25, 1959 in Kouvola, Finland) is a retired professional ice hockey player who played in the SM-liiga.  He played for Tappara.  He was inducted into the Finnish Hockey Hall of Fame in 2000.

Career statistics

Regular season and playoffs

International

External links
 Finnish Hockey Hall of Fame bio

1959 births
Finnish ice hockey left wingers
Ice hockey players at the 1980 Winter Olympics
Ice hockey players at the 1988 Winter Olympics
Ice hockey players with retired numbers
KooKoo players
Living people
Olympic ice hockey players of Finland
Olympic medalists in ice hockey
Olympic silver medalists for Finland
People from Kouvola
Tappara players
Sportspeople from Kymenlaakso